CloudBolt is a hybrid cloud management platform developed by CloudBolt Software for deploying and managing virtual machines (VMs), applications, and other IT resources, both in public clouds (e.g., AWS, MS Azure, GCP) and in private data centers (e.g., VMware, OpenStack).

History 
The platform was developed by Alexandre Augusto "Auggy" da Rocha and Bernard Sanders. da Rocha began work on a prototype of the platform in 2010, calling it SmartCloud 1.0. Together they created a generalized solution, which was released in August 2011 as SmartCloud 2.0. The early version focused on simple installs and upgrades of virtual machines, and building an extensible product that customers could use as a platform for integrating with other technologies.

In 2012, they renamed their company to CloudBolt Software (to avoid a name conflict with an IBM offering), and in 2013 CloudBolt Command and Control (C2) was included as the cloud manager in Dell Cloud for US Government. In 2014, the product name "CloudBolt Command and Control (C2)" was simplified to "CloudBolt".

Product Timeline:

 2011 - 2.0 released, with support only for VMware & HP Server Automation (formerly Opsware)
 2012 - 3.0 released, rebranded as CloudBolt with support for AWS & OpenStack added
 2013 - 4.0 released, support for Microsoft Azure, Google Cloud Platform, Infoblox, vCO (now vRO), and HP Operations Orchestration, Cobbler
 2014 - 4.5 released, including integration with Puppet & Chef, ServiceNow
 2015 - 5.0 released with support for Kubernetes container orchestrator and Razor bare metal provisioning
 2016 - 6.0 released, with support for Azure ARM, Ansible, Oracle Public Cloud
 2017 - 7.0 released, with 18 total public clouds and private virtualization systems supported, 4 configuration managers, and 2 external orchestrators
 2018 - 8.0 released, with everything-as-a-service (XaaS), enhanced containerization and Kubernetes support
 2019 - 9.0 released, with support for infrastructure-as-code (Terraform), expanded self-service workload delivery, security, and multi-cloud management
The company received Series A funding from Insight Venture Partners in July 2018.

Industry recognition 

SIIA CODiE Award for Best Cloud Management Solution, 2020.
Gartner names CloudBolt a "Challenger" in its 2020 Magic Quadrant for Cloud Management Platforms.
Tech Target's Impact award for best private and hybrid cloud management product, 2016.
 WhatMatrix for CloudManagement, 2017, 2018.

References

External links 

 Official site

Cloud computing
Cloud infrastructure
Cloud applications
Cloud computing providers
Companies established in 2012
2012 establishments in Maryland